The second series of the music talent show The X Factor Greece began airing on ANT1 on 2 October 2009, and was won by Stavros Michalakakos of Limassol (Lemesos), Cyprus on 12 February 2010. The show was presented for a second year by Sakis Rouvas. It was also broadcast abroad via ANT1's international stations. The series featured Eleftheria Eleftheriou and Ivi Adamou who both participated in the Eurovision Song Contest 2012 representing Greece and Cyprus as well as Hovig who represented Cyprus in the Eurovision Song Contest 2017. Also the runner up of the series, Nini Shermadini, was one of the Georgian backing vocalists.

Selection process
Public auditions by aspiring pop singers began in July 2009 and were held in three cities; Athens and Thessaloniki (Greece) and Larnaka (Cyprus).
All four series 1 judges, George Levendis, Giorgos Theofanous, Katerina Gagaki and Nikos Mouratidis returned to judge the contestants. Following initial auditions, in September 2009, around 200 acts attended the boot camp. The contestants were initially split into groups of three, and judges gave instant decisions on who would leave based on the group performances, bringing the number of acts down to 150. The judges then cut the number of acts down to 80. These were split into four categories: Boys, Girls, Over 25s and Groups, before the judges discovered which category they would mentor for the rest of the competition. 
In series 2, the Boys (16–24) are being mentored by Nikos Mouratidis, Giorgos Theofanous has the Girls (16–24), Katerina Gagaki mentors the Over 25s, and George Levendis takes charge of the Groups. At the last stage of boot camp, the 80 acts were reduced to 32. During "Judges' Houses", the 32 acts were reduced to 16, who went on to the live finals, with one act being eliminated each week by a combination of public vote and judges' decision until a winner was found.

Contestants and categories
The top 16 acts were confirmed as follows:

Key:
 – Winner
 – Runner-up
 – Third Place

Live shows
The live shows started on 30 October 2009. The acts are performing every Friday night with the results announced on the same day. As a marked difference from series 1, in this series the televoters have the chance to vote from the beginning of the show.

Results Summary
Colour key

 1.  George's vote counted as two votes and therefore Ivi had 3 votes while Nini had only two.

Week 14 (5 February – Semi-Final)
Theme: Mentor's choice
Celebrity Performers:Professional Sinnerz "Tha rthw na se brw", "Otan Se Eicha Protodei" / Apostolina Mai "Save me"

Judges' votes to eliminate
Katerina Gagaki: 48 Ores  
George Levendis: Eleni Alexandri 
Nikos Mouratidis: Eleni Alexandri    
Giorgos Theofanous: 48 Ores   
The result went to deadlock, and Eleni Alexandri was eliminated from the competition.

Week 15 (12 February – Final)
Themes: Mentor's choice
Celebrity performers: Oceana (singer) "Cry Cry", "Lala" / Medina (singer) "You and I (Medina song)"/ Vegas (with the finalists of Next Top Model (Greece)) "hrthe i stigmh" and Sakis Rouvas "+ Se Thelo", "Hamogela", "Irthes", "Spase to Hrono", "Ola Giro Sou Girizoun"

* Even though the November 27 show was supposed to feature the remaining 12 participants, only 10 competitors took part. Two acts, Eleni Alexandri and 360 Moires, did not participate due to H1N1 symptoms. However, the fact that despite their absence they automatically qualified for the next show, coupled with the elimination of a talented participant, sparked controversy.

The presenter, Sakis Rouvas, was obviously shocked and puzzled by Eleftheria's elimination and instantly offered her the opportunity to continue her career with him in his regular performances.

** Eliminated by public vote after the judges forced a tie.

References

Greece 02